Cook Park may refer to:

 Cook Park, Orange, a park in New South Wales, Australia
 Cook Park, St Marys, a multi-use venue in New South Wales, Australia
 Rodney Cook Sr. Park, Atlanta, Georgia, U.S.

See also
 Mount Cook National Park (disambiguation)
 Cook Park Library, a facility in the Cook Memorial Public Library District in Libertyville, Illinois, United States